Classic Car Weekly is a British car newspaper published by the Bauer Media Group.

History and profile
Launched in 1990 by Emap, Classic Car Weekly comes out weekly on a Wednesday, and majors on news and auction coverage, as well as running regular articles on buying, selling, maintaining and driving classic cars. The current editor is David Simister. 

It is a newsprint A3-sized publication, and primarily carries a mixture of private-seller advertising and editorial articles. From 2002 to the end of 2009 the title was published under licence by Kelsey Publishing, Bauer Media, which had bought EMAP's consumer magazines in the meantime, took it back from Kelsey at the end of 2009. Classic Car Weekly is now one of a group of UK motoring titles published by Bauer, including Practical Classics, Land Rover Owner, Car, Car Mechanics, Classic Cars, and Modern Classics. Kelsey responded by launching its own weekly competitor, Classic Car Buyer. 

The newspaper's average reader owns two classic cars, but also aims to be the first port of call for traders and private owners looking to buy or sell classic cars, and is also used for the latest information about the classic car market and for details of classic cars.

Regular content and features 
 The Way We Were: images from the 1950s-1990s and a discussion of the cars featured in the images
 Five Classic Trials: an assessment of a classic car tested by Classic Car Weekly
The following sections regularly appear in Classic Car Weekly every Wednesday: This Week, Out and About, Living With Classics, Buying and Selling

This Week 

 Myth Buster: a regular column which de-bunks popular misconceptions about classic cars
 Products: reviews of classic car-related products and books
 Value My Classic: a weekly assessment of what a classic car - typically belonging to one of the readers - is worth

Out and About 

 Reports on classic shows from around the UK, such as the Goodwood Revival, or European events, including Techno Classica Essen and the Le Mans Classic

Living With Classics 

 Our Classics: updates on classic cars owned by members of the Classic Car Weekly team, and contributors including Jon Bentley and Steve Berry
 Mods and Consequences: a rundown of what modifications can be made to classic cars, focusing on a different model each week
 £500 Challenge: updates on running a Ford Puma, Mercedes-Benz S-class and MG ZR bought by Classic Car Weekly for £500 each

Buying and Selling 

 Classic Risers: a look at how values of classic car models have increased over a 15-year period, and a prediction of their future values
 Buying Classics Abroad: an assessment of international classic car prices

Awards 
Classic Car Weekly won the Automotive Consumer Publication award at the 2017 Newspress Awards.

References

External links
 Official website

1990 establishments in the United Kingdom
Automobile magazines published in the United Kingdom
Bauer Group (UK)
Magazines established in 1990
Mass media in Peterborough
Weekly magazines published in the United Kingdom